The United States' S-class submarines, often simply called S-boats (sometimes "Sugar" boats, after the then-contemporary Navy phonetic alphabet for "S"), were the first class of submarines with a significant number built to United States Navy designs. They made up the bulk of the USN submarine service in the interwar years and could be found in every theater of operations. While not considered "Fleet Submarines" in the traditional sense of that term, they were the first submarines in the USN designed for open ocean, blue water operations. All previous submarines had been intended for harbor or coastal defense. These boats were intended to have greater speed and range than previous classes, with improved habitability and greater armament.

The S-class were designed during World War I, but not completed until after the war. Many boats of the class remained in service through World War II.

The United States Navy commissioned 51 S-class submarines from 1920 to 1925. The first boat in name sequence, was commissioned in 1920 and the last numerically, in 1922. The S class is subdivided into four groups of different designs:
Group I (S-1 class, or "Holland" type): 25 boats, S-1 and S-18 to S-41, built by Bethlehem Steel at Fore River Shipyard in Quincy, Massachusetts and Union Iron Works in San Francisco, California, as subcontractors for the designer, the Electric Boat Company.
Group II (S-3 class, or "Navy Yard" type): 15 boats, S-3 to S-17, built at the Portsmouth Navy Yard and Lake Torpedo Boat at Bridgeport, Connecticut.
Group III (S-42 class, or "2nd Holland" type): 6 boats, S-42 to S-47, built at Fore River.
Group IV (S-48 class, or "2nd Navy Yard" type): 4 boats, S-48 to S-51, built by Lake.

S-2 was a prototype built by Lake, and was not repeated.

The first three boats in name sequence, the S-1, S-2, and S-3, were prototypes authorized in Fiscal Year 1918 and were built to the same specifications: S-1 designed by Electric Boat, S-2 by Lake, and S-3 by the Bureau of Construction and Repair (BuC&R) (later Bureau of Ships). The Electric Boat and BuC&R designs were put into series production in later fiscal year appropriations.

SS-159 to SS-168 (2nd Holland) and SS-173 to SS-176 (2nd Navy Yard) were cancelled and, contrary to later practice, the hull numbers were used for subsequent submarines. Some of the material for these was used by Electric Boat to build the Peruvian Navy's four R-boats.

The first S-boat placed into commission was the S-3 on 30 January 1919, followed (in order) by S-4, S-5, S-6, and S-2.

Design
Intelligence reports received from 1914 to 1916 showed that the German U-boats then operating off Great Britain far exceeded the capabilities of the then current H, K, L, and N classes of USN submarines. If Great Britain were to fall, those boats would be unable to cross the Atlantic and fight once they got there, and this drove the requirements for the designs that would become the S-class. The Navy's specifications called for a boat of 800 tons, with a speed of 11-14 knots and a range between 3400 and 5400 nautical miles. It was to be armed with four 21-inch torpedo tubes and a 4-inch deck gun. The Navy turned to its traditional submarine builders, Electric Boat and Lake, and asked them to submit designs, but for the first time the Navy itself developed a design to be built at its own Navy Yards. The Navy wanted to diversify the acquisition process and provide some level of competition to Electric Boat.

Even though the FY-18 boats were considered to be prototypes, the Electric Boat (EB) and the BuC&R designs were intended for series production from the very beginning. The EB design formed the basis for the Group I and Group IV boats and were essentially enlarged versions of all their previous designs. A single hull design, all of the ballast tanks were contained within the pressure hull. The hull was a rounded spindle shape and the rudder was placed at the very end of the hull, aft of the twin screws. Compared to the previous R-boats, Group I S-boats were  longer, with  more beam,  more draft, and 60% greater displacement. This allowed for greater range, larger engines and higher speed, and more torpedo reloads, though the number of forward torpedo tubes was unchanged.

The Lake design, S-2, was a modified double hull type, with ballast tanks wrapped around the inner pressure hull. The stern ended in a flat "shovel" shape which gave the stern needed buoyancy. The rudder was mounted beneath the stern and the pivot structure also supported the stern diving planes. To gain surface buoyancy, the superstructure atop the boat was partially watertight. Sea trials showed that the bow tended to burrow into the waves so Lake added a buoyancy tank to the bow, which gave it a humped appearance. This boat suffered from poor maneuverability and was overcomplicated. It proved to be unreliable and was not well liked by its crew. The Navy did not choose it for mass production and no further boats were produced to this design.

The BuC&R design that became the S-3 was a full double hull type that incorporated some design features of both the Electric Boat and Lake designs. At 231 feet long it was longer and a little wider than the other two designs. The battery was contained in one large compartment forward of the control room, giving the boat a long, sleek appearance. The long hull ended in a sharp vertical "chisel" at the stern, and the rudder and stern dive planes were ventrally mounted under the hull, behind the propellers.

Four of the Group II and all four the Group IV boats had an additional single stern torpedo tube. Group IV was also longer and had less draft. The Electric Boat designs (Groups I and III) were single-hulled, the others were double-hulled. All S-boats had a 4-inch (102 mm)/50 caliber deck gun, a significant increase over the 3-inch gun of previous US submarines. This was due to observations that the German U-boats frequently used their deck guns, and many U-boats were equipped with 105 mm (4.1-inch) deck guns. Another improvement was the conning tower fairwater. Previous US submarines had small fairwaters to reduce drag and improve submerged speed. Experience gained on North Atlantic patrols during World War I showed that the boats would be spending considerable time on the surface and thus needed better protection for the bridge watchstanders. Examination of captured U-boats after the Armistice also showed that a larger fairwater with permanent grab rails was preferable when surfaced in the North Atlantic, so S-boats were built or backfitted with an improved and much larger fairwater.

Future admiral Hyman G. Rickover was assigned to USS S-48. He later credited the "faulty, sooty, dangerous and repellent engineering" of the S-class boats with inspiring his obsession for high engineering standards.

In 1923, USS S-1 experimented with a float plane (an idea the Japanese would later adopt). A cylindrical hangar was installed on the after deck to house a single Martin MS-1 float plane. Tests showed the concept to be unworkable, and the equipment was subsequently removed. The hangar was later reused and rebuilt as the prototype for the McCann Rescue Chamber, a diving bell for rescuing crewmen from sunken submarines.

Service
The first two boats completed by EB were the S-1 at Quincy and the S-30 at San Francisco. During builder's sea trials both boats experienced severe torsional drive train vibrations during their required high-speed runs. The vibrations were so bad that both engines on both submarines were completely wrecked.  Subsequent investigation showed that the crankshafts of the NELSECO 8-EB-15 engines (built by an Electric Boat subsidiary) were of an insufficient diameter, and thus were not stiff enough to resist the power stroke of each cylinder/piston as it fired, resulting in excessive torsional twisting. This was a serious deficiency, and it threw the EB production process into chaos. Some boats lingered incomplete at the builder's yards, while others limped along at reduced power until a fix could be implemented. Eventually, the Navy Department, faced with the prospect of having a majority of the S-class being unable to meet its desired operational parameters, acquired additional funding for EB to rebuild the engines with a crankshaft of increased diameter. This solved the torsional vibration problem, but the rebuild work considerably delayed the delivery of the EB boats to the Navy, resulting in average build times exceeding 4 1/2 years. Once the engine problem was resolved, the EB boats turned in excellent service to the USN, with many serving until the end of WWII.

The boats built to the BuC&R design by Portsmouth and Lake used a Bureau built MAN diesel engine, or in the case of Lake a 2-cycle or 4-cycle Busch-Sulzer engine. These engine types, while still suffering from design and engineering problems inherent in all early diesel engines, were much more reliable than the NELSECO engines used by EB and they turned in acceptable performance throughout their service lives.

World War II service
At the entry of the United States into World War II in December 1941, the S-class submarines ranged in age from 16 to 21 years.  While the US Navy had two older classes of submarines at that time (the O and R classes originally commissioned in 1918 and 1919), the S-class was the oldest class of submarine (possibly in the world) to be used in combat operations.

During World War II, 37 S-boats were in service when the United States entered the war in December 1941. Twenty S-boats were awarded battle stars and 17 were credited with sinking a collective total of 42 Japanese ships.  Six commissioned S-boats were lost during the war - five due to accidents (three by grounding, one by collision and one by flooding) and one (S-44) in combat.

Some S-class boats were transferred to other navies.   Five (S-1, S-21, S-22, S-24 and S-29) were transferred to the Royal Navy between March and September of 1942 and one, S-25, to Poland in November 1941. These were mostly used for training in anti-submarine warfare and removed from service by mid-1944.

S boats saw service in World War II in both the Atlantic and the Pacific. Smaller and slower than the later fleet submarines produced for war service, and lacking the range for Pacific Ocean patrols (as well as being 20 years old), they were used in reconnaissance and supply roles, as well as for coastal defense.

Eight S-boats (S-11 thru S-17 and S-48) spent the war entirely in the Atlantic theater.  Their operations ranged from Coco Solo in Panama to Casco Bay in Maine.

S-boats operated in the Alaska theater during the aftermath of the Battle of the Aleutian Islands, based out of Dutch Harbor. Some also operated out of Australia in the Southwest Pacific Area.  Most were withdrawn from front-line service by late 1943 as more  fleet submarines became available, and were relegated to ASW training. Two S boats (S-42 and S-47) conducted combat patrols in 1944 with the last combat patrol by an S boat being conducted by S-42 from 5 August to 3 September 1944.

In World War II, S-class boats did not use the newer Mark 14 torpedo, standard in fleet submarines, due to shorter torpedo tubes, relying on the World War I-vintage Mark 10 instead. (Due to production shortages, many fleet boats used Mark 10s, also. Since the Mark 14 suffered from a high failure rate early in the war, this was not necessarily a disadvantage.)

In the aftermath of the disastrous defeat of the USN and RAN at the Battle of Savo Island, the S-44 encountered the withdrawing Japanese force near Kavieng on the morning of 10 August 1942. Having found themselves in the perfect position, the crew of the S-44 launched a spread of four Mark 10 torpedoes, three of which hit the heavy cruiser Kako. The mortally wounded cruiser sank in seven minutes and the S-44 escaped.

As newer submarines were put in service during World War II, S-boats were withdrawn from combat service and provided training support instead.  Starting in late 1944, a total of 11 boats were decommissioned and used for experimental purposes, including being sunk by experimental weapons.

13 S-boats were still in service when the Japanese surrendered on 2 September 1945.  Of the 13, 11 were decommissioned in October 1945, one in November and S-15 remained in commission until June 1946.

S-boat fates
All S-boats were scrapped after World War II except those listed below.

Lost at sea between wars
4 submarines
 - Sunk in a collision with the United States Coast Guard destroyer , off Provincetown, Massachusetts, on 17 December 1927, 40 men were killed; later raised, repaired, and served as a salvage and submarine escape test boat before being finally sunk as a target 15 May 1936.
 - Lost 1 September 1920, in a diving accident off the Delaware Capes with no loss of life. Subsequent salvage attempts failed and the boat was left on the bottom off Cape May, New Jersey. 
 - Sunk in a diving accident with no loss of life before commissioning 7 December 1921; raised and commissioned on 14 October 1922; served during World War II and scrapped in 1946. 
 - Sunk in a collision with SS City of Rome off Block Island, 25 September 1925, 33 men were killed; raised and later scrapped 1930.

Scrapped between World War I and World War II
6 submarines

Decommissioned between World War I and World War II and not recommissioned, eventually scrapped

Transferred to the Royal Navy during World War II
6 submarines
 to RN as P.552 in 1942, removed from service Jan 1944; returned to US and scrapped 1945
 (as P.553) returned to US and sunk as target 23 March 1945
 (as P.554) returned to US and scrapped 1945
 (as P.555) returned to US and sunk as target 1947
 (as P.551) later transferred to the Polish Navy as ORP Jastrząb; scuttled after hit by friendly fire 2 May 1942
 (as P.556) returned to US on paper in 1946 after battery explosion, partially scrapped in UK 1947, scrapping completed in Spain 1987

Lost during World War II
7 submarines (1 to enemy action)
 Grounded, 19 June 1942, off St. Makarius Point, Amchitka Island, Alaska. Abandoned, 25 June 1942.
 Sunk 4 July 1944, due to a hull failure off Pearl Harbor. The wreck was found in two pieces by the Lost 52 Project, in December 2017.
 Grounded, on Taka Bakang Reef, in the Makassar Strait, Dutch East Indies. Scuttled, 21 January 1942.
 Grounded, 13 August 1942, off Rossel Island, in the Coral Sea.
 Lost to enemy action enroute to her patrol area near the Kuril Islands . Sunk by the Japanese escort ship Ishigaki, 7 October 1943.
 Stricken and sold for scrap 25 May 1931; hulked in 1936; hulk reacquired by the U.S. Navy for "experimental purposes"; foundered and sank off Point Patience, in the Patuxent River, 16 December 1942. This is not counted among the 52 US submarines lost during World War II, as the vessel was not in commission at the time.

Other fates
11 S-boats were decommissioned in 1944 and 1945 prior to the surrender of Japan.  They were mostly expended as targets. The wrecksite of the target boat USS S-35 was located off Oahu, by the Lost 52 Project in 2017, not far from the S-28.

13 S-boats were in commission when the Japanese surrendered on 2 September 1945.  All except one, were decommissioned by the end of November 1945.  S-15 was decommissioned in June 1946.

General characteristics

Group I 
(1st Electric Boat (aka Holland) design)
Displacement: 854 tons surfaced; 1,062 tons submerged
Length: 
Beam: 
Draft: 
Propulsion: 2 × New London Ship and Engine Company (NELSECO) diesels, 600 hp (448 kW) each; 2 × Electro-Dynamic (S-1, S-30-S-35), Ridgway (S-18, S-20 through S-29), or General Electric (S-36 through S-41) electric motors,  each; 120 cell Exide battery; two shafts.
Bunkerage: 168 tons oil fuel
Speed: 14.5 knots (27 km/h) surfaced; 11 knots (20 km/h) submerged
Range: 5,000 miles (8,000 km) at 10 knots (19 km/h) surfaced
Test depth: 200 ft (61 m)
Armament (as built): 4 × 21 inch (533 mm) torpedo tubes (bow, 12 torpedoes); 1 × 4 inch (102 mm)/50 cal deck gun
Crew: 38 (later 42) officers and men
Boats in Group: S-1, S-18 through S-41

Group II 
(1st Navy Yard design)
Displacement: 876 tons surfaced; 1,092 tons submerged
Length: 
Beam: 
Draft: 
Propulsion: 2 × MAN (S-3 through S-13) or Busch-Sulzer (S-14 through S-17) diesels, 1,000 hp (746 kW) each; 2 × Westinghouse electric motors, 600 hp (447 kW) each; 120-cell Exide battery; two shafts.
Speed: 15 knots (28 km/h) surfaced; 11 knots (20 km/h) submerged
Bunkerage: 148 tons oil fuel
Range:  at  surfaced
Test depth: 200 ft (61 m)
Armament (as built): 4 × 21 in (533 mm) torpedo tubes (bow, 12 torpedoes) or (S-11 through S-13) 5 (four bow, one stern, 14 torpedoes);1 × 4 inch (102 mm)/50 caliber deck gun
Crew: 38 (later 42) officers and men
Boats in Group: S-3 through S-17

Group III 
(2nd Electric Boat (aka Holland) design)
Displacement: 906 tons surfaced; 1,126 tons submerged
Length: ,  overall
Beam: 
Draft: 
Propulsion: 2 × NELSECO diesels, 600 hp (448 kW) each; 2 × Electro-Dynamic electric motors,  each; 120 cell Exide battery; two shafts.
Speed: 15 knots (28 km/h) surfaced; 11 knots (20 km/h) submerged
Bunkerage: 185 tons oil fuel
Range:  at  surfaced
Test depth: 200 ft (61 m)
Armament (as built): 4 × 21 in (533 mm) torpedo tubes (bow, 12 torpedoes); 1 × 4 in (102 mm)/50 cal deck gun
Crew: 38 (later 42) officers and men
Boats in Group: S-42 through S-47

Group IV 
(2nd Navy Yard design)
Displacement: 903 tons surfaced; 1230 tons submerged
Length: ,  overall
Beam: 
Draft: 
Propulsion: 2 × Busch-Sulzer diesels, 900 hp (670 kW) each; 2 × Ridgway electric motors,  each; 120 cell Exide battery; two shafts.
Bunkerage: 177 tons oil fuel
Speed: 14.5 knots (27 km/h) surfaced; 11 knots (20 km/h) submerged
Range:  at  surfaced
Depth: 200 ft (61 m)
Armament (as built): 5 × 21 in (533 mm) torpedo tubes (4 bow, 1 stern, 14 torpedoes); 1 × 4 in (102 mm)/50 cal deck gun
Crew: 38 (later 45) officers and men
Boats in Group: S-48 through S-51

S-2 
(Lake Torpedo Boat Company design)
Displacement: 800 tons surfaced; 977 tons submerged
Length:  overall
Beam: 
Draft: 
Propulsion: 2 × diesels, 900 hp (670 kW) each; 2 × electric motors,  each; two shafts.
Speed: 15 knots (28 km/h) surfaced; 11 knots (20 km/h) submerged
Range:  at  surfaced
Depth: 200 ft (61 m)
Armament (as built): 4 × 21 in (533 mm) torpedo tubes (bow, 12 torpedoes); 1 × 4 in (102 mm)/50 cal deck gun
Crew: 38 officers and men

See also
 Allied submarines in the Pacific War
 Unrestricted submarine warfare
 List of submarine classes of the United States Navy
 List of lost United States submarines

Notes and references

 Campbell, John Naval Weapons of World War Two (Naval Institute Press, 1985), .
 
 Gardiner, Robert, Conway's All the World's Fighting Ships 1906-1921, pp. 130–131, London: Conway Maritime Press, 1985. .
 Gardiner, Robert and Chesneau, Roger, Conway's All the World's Fighting Ships 1922-1946, p. 96, London: Conway Maritime Press, 1980. .
 Johnston, David A Visual Guide to the S-Class Submarines 1918-1945 Part One: The Prototypes
 Johnston, David A Visual Guide to the S-Class Submarines 1918-1945 Part Two: The Government Boats
 Johnston, David A Visual Guide to the S-Class Submarines 1918-1945 Part Three: The Electric Boat Series
 Johnston, David "The Devil in the Details: An Analysis of S-class Submarine Construction 1917-1925", The Submarine Review, December 2020, pp. 71–94
 Lenton, H. T. American Submarines (Navies of the Second World War) (Doubleday, 1973), .
 Silverstone, Paul H., U.S. Warships of World War I, p. 148, (Ian Allan, 1970), .
 Silverstone, Paul H., U.S. Warships of World War II, pp. 180–184, (Ian Allan, 1965), .

External links 

 A picture
 Navsource.org early diesel submarines photo gallery index
 Pigboats.com S-boats photo gallery
 List of WWII US submarines at FleetSubmarine.com
 DiGiulian, Tony Navweaps.com 4"/50 caliber gun
 On Eternal Patrol, website dedicated to all US submarines and submariners lost to all causes

 
S
 S class